Stragnai II is a village in Klaipėda District Municipality, in Klaipėda County, in western Lithuania. According to the 2021 census, the village had population of 254 inhabitants.

History
On 5 January 2023 the village was flooded after Minija river broke through the flood walls.

Demography

References

Villages in Klaipėda County